Agia Varvara (meaning Saint Barbara) is a suburb in the western part of Athens, Greece.

Geography

Agia Varvara is situated east of the mountain Aigaleo (Greek: Αιγάλεω). The municipality has an area of 2.425 km2. It is served by the Agia Varvara and Agia Marina stations on Line 3 of the Athens Metro.

Historical population

References 

Municipalities of Attica
Populated places in West Athens (regional unit)